Ebenezer Herrick (October 21, 1785 – May 7, 1839) was a U.S. Representative from Maine, father of Anson Herrick.

Biography
Born in Lewiston, Maine (then a district of Massachusetts), Herrick attended the common schools.  He studied law, was admitted to the bar and commenced practice in Bowdoinham, Maine.  He then engaged in mercantile pursuits 1814–1818. He served as member of the Massachusetts House of Representatives in 1819, served as member of the convention which formed the first constitution of the State of Maine in 1820, and was Secretary of the Maine Senate in 1821.

Herrick was elected as a Democratic-Republican to the Seventeenth Congress, elected as an Adams-Clay Republican to the Eighteenth Congress, and reelected as an Adams candidate to the Nineteenth Congress (March 4, 1821 – March 3, 1827).  He declined to be a candidate for reelection in 1826, and served  as a member of the Maine Senate.  He died in Lewiston on May 7, 1839, and was interred in the Old Herrick Burying Ground.

References

1785 births
1839 deaths
Maine Democratic-Republicans
Massachusetts Democratic-Republicans
Politicians from Lewiston, Maine
Maine state senators
People from Bowdoinham, Maine
Members of the Massachusetts House of Representatives
Democratic-Republican Party members of the United States House of Representatives
National Republican Party members of the United States House of Representatives from Maine
19th-century American politicians